Makoun is a surname. Notable people with the surname include:

Christian Makoun (born 2000), Venezuelan-Cameroonian footballer
Jean Makoun (born 1983), Cameroonian footballer

Surnames of African origin